John Morison (c.1757 – 12 February 1835) was a British politician who sat in the House of Commons from 1827 to 1832.

In 1827, Morison was elected as the Member of Parliament (MP) for Banffshire, Scotland. He held the seat until 1832. He was also known as John of Auchintoul.

References

External links

1750s births
1835 deaths
Members of the Parliament of the United Kingdom for Scottish constituencies
UK MPs 1826–1830
UK MPs 1830–1831
UK MPs 1831–1832